The Bullet Monoplane or Alexander Eaglerock Bullet was a low wing cabin monoplane that was a departure from traditional biplane aircraft of the era.

Design and development
The Bullet was built at the beginning of the Great Depression. Company owner J Don Alexander said he was inspired by ducks tucking in their legs to build a retractable landing gear-equipped aircraft. The aircraft experienced stability problems in spin testing, killing two pilots. Few orders were delivered.

The Bullet was a low wing, cabin aircraft with retractable conventional landing gear. The fuselage was constructed with welded steel tubing and the wings were constructed with wooden spars and ribs, both with aircraft fabric covering.

Operational history
An Alexander Eaglerock Bullet competed in the 1929 National Air Races. Female pilot Jessie "Chubbie" Keith-Miller won two transcontinental air races piloting an Alexander Eaglerock Bullet.

Variants
Data from: Aerofiles
Eaglerock Bullet C-1 
Powered by a Wright J-6 Whirlwind
Eaglerock Bullet C-3 
Powered by a Kinner K-5
Eaglerock Bullet C-4
Powered by a  Wright J-6 5-cylinder radial (optional  Comet 7-E or  Axelson-Floco B)
Eaglerock Bullet C-5
Powered by a  Wright J-6 5-cylinder radial (optional  Comet 7-E or  Axelson-Floco B)
Eaglerock Bullet C-7
Aerodynamically improved - ATC#318 issued on 6 May 1930.

Specifications (C-7 Bullet)

References

External links

Bullet Project 

Low-wing aircraft